Homer is a town in Cortland County, New York, United States of America. The population was 6,405 at the 2010 census. The name is from the Greek poet Homer.

The town of Homer contains a village called Homer. The town is situated on the west border of Cortland County, immediately north of the city of Cortland.

History 
The region was part of the Central New York Military Tract, from which the cash-poor federal government granted land to soldiers of the American Revolution to pay them for their service. "Homer" was the name of one of the townships in the Military Tract, this name being assigned by a town clerk.

The area was settled in 1791. The Town of Homer was established when Onondaga County was formed in 1794. Cortland County was subsequently formed from Onondaga County.

In 1835, the village of Homer set itself off from the town by incorporation.

Notable people

 Isaac Atwater, Minnesota jurist
 Alexander O. Babcock, Wisconsin politician
 Sarah E. Beard, medical researcher
 Francis Bicknell Carpenter, artist
 Patrick Conway, bandleader
 Dale Dorman, Boston radio and television personality
 Adin P. Hobart, Wisconsin legislator
 Linda A. Mason, Mercy Corps chairwoman; co-founder of Bright Horizon Children's Center
 Milo Goodrich, Republican United States Representative 
 George L. Otis, Minnesota politician
 Arthur C. Sidman, actor and playwright
 William Stoddard, secretary to President Abraham Lincoln during his years at the White House
 Eugene A. Tucker, politician and jurist
 Eleazer Wakeley, Nebraska and Wisconsin politician and jurist
 Solmous Wakeley, Wisconsin legislator
 Andrew Dickson White, diplomat, educator, historian, first president of Cornell University
 Orrin T. Williams, Wisconsin state court judge and legislator
 Catherine Bertini, 2003 World Food Prize Laureate & former Executive Director, United Nations World Food Program

Geography

The western town line is the border of Cayuga County.

Interstate 81, U.S. Route 11, and New York State Route 281 are north-south highways. New York State Route 41 and New York State Route 90 converge on Homer village from the west. New York State Route 41A converges on NY-41 in the northwest quadrant of Homer. New York State Route 13 cuts across the southeast quadrant.

The East Branch and West Branch of the Tioughnioga River flow southward through Homer. Lower and Upper Little York Lakes are fed and drained by the West Branch. All of the town except for its western edge is part of the Susquehanna River watershed. The westernmost part of the town drains west to Fall Creek, part of the Cayuga Lake watershed that ultimately drains north to Lake Ontario.

Demographics

As of the census of 2000, there were 6,363 people, 2,446 households, and 1,746 families residing in the town.  The population density was 126.3 people per square mile (48.8/km2).  There were 2,603 housing units at an average density of 51.7 per square mile (20.0/km2).  The racial makeup of the town was 98.11% White, 0.41% Black or African American, 0.22% Native American, 0.27% Asian, 0.02% Pacific Islander, 0.30% from other races, and 0.68% from two or more races. Hispanic or Latino of any race were 0.85% of the population.

There were 2,446 households, out of which 35.1% had children under the age of 18 living with them, 56.9% were married couples living together, 11.0% had a female householder with no husband present, and 28.6% were non-families. 22.0% of all households were made up of individuals, and 10.2% had someone living alone who was 65 years of age or older.  The average household size was 2.57 and the average family size was 3.00.

In the town, the population was spread out, with 26.6% under the age of 18, 6.8% from 18 to 24, 28.0% from 25 to 44, 25.1% from 45 to 64, and 13.5% who were 65 years of age or older.  The median age was 38 years. For every 100 females, there were 92.8 males.  For every 100 females age 18 and over, there were 88.0 males.

The median income for a household in the town was $41,321, and the median income for a family was $51,968. Males had a median income of $34,873 versus $23,656 for females. The per capita income for the town was $20,145.  About 6.3% of families and 9.4% of the population were below the poverty line, including 16.7% of those under age 18 and 9.2% of those age 65 or over.

Communities and locations in the Town of Homer 
East Homer – A hamlet east of Homer village, located on NY-13.
East River – A hamlet southwest of East Homer.
Homer – The village of Homer is on the southern border of the town, north of Cortland on US-11 and NY-281. Homer is next to the West Branch of the Tioughnioga River.
Little York – A hamlet north of Pratt Corner on NY-281.
Pratt Corners – A hamlet north of Homer village on NY-281.

See also
Homer Senior High School (New York)

References

External links
 Town of Homer official website
 Town of Homer at Cortland County website
 Homer Central School District
  Early history of Homer, NY
  Cortland County BDC - IDA

Towns in Cortland County, New York
1794 establishments in New York (state)
Populated places established in 1794